Habib-i Najjar Mosque is a historical mosque in Antakya, Hatay Province, Turkey named after Habib the Carpenter. The mosque is to the east of Orontes River. The mosque was severely damaged by earthquakes in February 2023.

History
In antiquity, there was most probably a pagan temple in place of the current mosque. During the Christian era, it was converted into a church named after John the Baptist. In the Medieval Age, the city was captured first by the Rashidun Caliphate in 637, by the Byzantine Empire in 969, by the Seljuk Turks in 1084, by the Crusades in 1098, and by the Baibars of the Mamluk Sultanate in 1268. Concurrently in each case, the status of the building was changed from church to mosque and from mosque to church. However, in the inscription of the mosque, it reads that it was rebuilt in 1275 soon after Baibars had converted it to a mosque.

The mosque was demolished during the 1853 earthquake. It was rebuilt by the Ottomans but the minaret was left standing and is older. The shadirvan (ablution fountain) is a later addition.

The mosque was destroyed in the 2023 earthquake.

Habib-i Nejjar

The mosque was named after Habib'i Neccar or Habib al-Najjar, a carpenter, who lived in the time of Jesus Christ. In the early years of Christianity, he was martyred by the pagans, who refused to convert. He was canonized a Christian saint.

Muslims believe he was martyred for calling people to the religion of Allah. He is referred to in the Quran, chapter Ya-Sin, verses 20–27, as the supporter of the disciples calling the people of Ya-Sin to the worship of the One God:

Two sarcophagi
The two sarcophagi found in the yard of the mosque are believed to belong to Jonah and John the Baptist, or the tomb of Habib along with that of Sham'un Al-Safa (Saint Peter, also known as Simon the Pure).

References

Antakya
Buildings and structures in Hatay Province
Mosques in Turkey
Religious buildings and structures completed in 1857
Buildings damaged by the 2023 Turkey–Syria earthquake
19th-century religious buildings and structures in Turkey